Zesterfleth may refer to:

Zesterfleth, an extinct village near Jork, Lower Saxony
Zesterfleth (family), a German noble family